Great Britain, represented by the British Olympic Association (BOA), competed at the 1932 Summer Olympics in Los Angeles, California, United States.  British athletes have competed in every Summer Olympic Games. 108 competitors, 90 men and 18 women, took part in 50 events in 10 sports. British athletes won four gold medals (up from three in 1928), and sixteen medals overall, finishing eighth.

Medallists

Athletics

Boxing

Cycling

Seven cyclists, all men, represented Great Britain in 1932.

Individual road race
 Frank Southall
 Charles Holland
 Stanley Butler
 William Harvell

Team road race
 Frank Southall
 Charles Holland
 Stanley Butler

Sprint
 Ernest Chambers

Time trial
 William Harvell

Tandem
 Ernest Chambers
 Stanley Chambers

Team pursuit
 Ernest Johnson
 William Harvell
 Frank Southall
 Charles Holland

Fencing

Three fencers, one man and two women, represented Great Britain in 1932.

Men's foil
 John Emrys Lloyd - 6th

Women's foil
 Judy Guinness - 2nd
 Peggy Butler - 10th

Modern pentathlon

Three male pentathletes represented Great Britain in 1932.

 Percy Legard
 Vernon Barlow
 Jeffrey MacDougall

Rowing

 Single scull - Dick Southwood - Fourth
Coxless pair - Lewis Clive,  Hugh Edwards  - Gold
 Coxless four - John Badcock, Jack Beresford, Hugh Edwards, and Rowland George - Gold
 Eight - Tom Askwith, D Haig-Thomas, C J S Sergel, D H E McCowen, K M Payne, H R N Rickett, W A T Sambell, L Luxton, J M Ranking - Fourth

Sailing

Swimming

Wrestling

Art competitions

References

Nations at the 1932 Summer Olympics
1932
Summer Olympics